System and Organization Controls (SOC), (also sometimes referred to as service organizations controls) as defined by the American Institute of Certified Public Accountants (AICPA), is the name of a suite of reports produced during an audit. It is intended for use by service organizations (organizations that provide information systems as a service to other organizations) to issue validated reports of internal controls over those information systems to the users of those services. The reports focus on controls grouped into five categories called Trust Service Principles. The AICPA  auditing standard  Statement on Standards for Attestation Engagements no. 18 (SSAE 18), section 320, "Reporting on an Examination of Controls at a Service Organization Relevant to User Entities' Internal Control Over Financial Reporting", defines two levels of reporting, type 1 and type 2. Additional AICPA guidance materials specify three types of reporting: SOC 1, SOC 2, and SOC 3.

Trust Service Principles
SOC 2 reports focus on controls addressed by five semi-overlapping categories called Trust Service Principles which also support the CIA triad of information security:
Security
Firewalls
Intrusion detection
Multi-factor authentication
Availability
Performance monitoring
Disaster recovery
Incident handling
Confidentiality
Encryption
Access controls
Firewalls
Processing Integrity
Quality assurance
Process monitoring
Adherence to principle
Privacy
Access control
Multi-factor authentication
Encryption

Reporting

Levels
There are two levels of SOC reports which are also specified by SSAE 18:
Type I, which describes a service organization's systems and whether the design of specified controls meet the relevant trust principles. (Are the design and documentation likely to accomplish the goals defined in the report?)
Type II, which also addresses the operational effectiveness of the specified controls over a period of time (usually 9 to 12 months). (Is the implementation appropriate?)

Types
There are three types of SOC reports.

SOC 1 – Internal Control over Financial Reporting (ICFR)
SOC 2 – Trust Services Criteria
SOC 3 – Trust Services Criteria for General Use Report

Additionally, there are specialized SOC reports for Cybersecurity and Supply Chain.

SOC 1 and SOC 2 reports are intended for a limited audience – specifically, users with an adequate understanding of the system in question. SOC 3 reports contain less specific information and can be distributed to the general public.

References

External links 
"Statement on Standards for Attestation Engagements 18, Attestation Standards: Clarification and Recodification", AICPA
"Professional Standards", section AT-C 320, AICPA
Auditing
Auditing standards
Sarbanes–Oxley Act
Standards